The 2014 Orlando City SC season was the club's fourth season of existence in Orlando, and their final season playing in the lower divisions. A Major League Soccer expansion franchise with the same name began play in 2015. The team entered the season as the defending USL Pro champions, beating Charlotte Eagles in the Championship Game after finishing second in the regular season.

Background 

On November 19, 2013, it was announced that Orlando City would be the next expansion franchise in Major League Soccer, the league's 21st team, to begin play in 2015. The announcement was made at Church Street Station in downtown Orlando, in the old Cheyenne Saloon, and was attended by an overflow crowd estimated by the Orlando Police Department at around 4,000. This made 2014 their final season in USL Pro.

Manager Adrian Heath said that the construction of the team for the 2014 season will be centered around getting players who can potentially move up with the team in 2015. As a result, he allowed several player contracts to lapse, only keeping a handful of vital personnel. He also signed goalkeeper Carl Woszczynski away from Los Angeles Blues, to play behind starting goalkeeper and team captain Miguel Gallardo.

Orlando City continued their affiliation with Sporting Kansas City through the MLS-USL Pro development alliance for the 2014 season. For the season, Sporting began transitioning their affiliation to Oklahoma City Energy FC, and would split their transfers between the two clubs before making Oklahoma City their sole affiliate in 2015.

The day before the MLS announcement, Orlando City and Orlando Health announced that the hospital system had signed a multi-year sponsorship contract which would make Orlando Health the team's presenting sponsor for its final USL Pro season, and going into MLS.

On June 3, 2014, Phil Rawlins sold Orlando City's USL Pro franchise license to minority owner Wayne Estopinal. While Orlando City moves on to MLS, the remaining USL Pro team will move to Louisville, Kentucky, in 2015 and become Louisville City FC. The team will maintain Orlando City's MLS colors. At the same time, James O'Connor retired as a player to become Louisville City's manager.

With the Citrus Bowl under construction, and their new stadium planned to open in 2016, Orlando City moved their games to the ESPN Wide World of Sports Complex. They played at Field 17 in the Hess Sports Fields, where they invested to expand its capacity to 5,300.

Competitions

Friendlies

WDW Pro Soccer Classic 

The team announced on December 5, 2013, that they would return to the Walt Disney World Pro Soccer Classic.

I-4 Derby

USL Pro 

All times from this point on Eastern Daylight Time (UTC−04:00)

USL Pro regular season

Results summary

Results

Standings

USL Pro Playoffs

U.S. Open Cup 

Orlando City entered the U.S. Open Cup in the second round.

Club

Roster

Squad information 

† = Denotes players on loan through USL Pro-MLS Reserve League alliance
# = Denotes players who retired during the season

Preseason Trialists 
2 — Ashani Fairclough
3 — Mason Trafford
9 — Adrián Ruelas
11 — Miguel Ibarra
16 — R. J. Allen
20 — Romena Bowie

Transfers

In 
 Aodhan Quinn was signed on free transfer on March 19, 2014. He was selected by Philadelphia Union in the third round of the 2014 MLS SuperDraft, but did not sign with the club.
 Kaká was signed as Orlando City's first Designated Player on free transfer on July 1, 2014, after being released from A.C. Milan.
 Giuseppe Gentile was signed on free transfer on July 11, 2014. He was released from Chicago Fire following a loan with Charlotte Eagles.
 Harrison Heath was signed on free transfer on July 17, 2014.
 Rafael Ramos was signed on August 7, 2014, on transfer from S.L. Benfica Juniors.
 Vladomiro Lameira, also known as "Estrela", was signed on August 7, 2014, on transfer from S.L. Benfica Juniors.

Out 
  Jamie Watson was transferred to Minnesota United FC for an undisclosed sum on February 20, 2014.
  Joseph Toby was transferred to Arizona United SC for future considerations on April 9, 2014.
  James O'Connor retired on June 3, 2014, to assume the role of manager at Louisville City FC.

Loan in 
  Yordany Álvarez, on loan from Real Salt Lake. Orlando City also has a transfer in place, where they will acquire Álvarez for the 2015 MLS season in exchange for their lowest 4th-round 2017 MLS SuperDraft pick. The agreement was terminated on August 29, 2014, when Álvarez retired for medical reasons following a collapse during a June 7 match.
  Mikey Lopez, on loan from Sporting Kansas City via the USL Pro-MLS Reserve League alliance
  Brian Span, on loan from FC Dallas. He was recalled on June 8, 2014, but returned to Orlando City after one match.
  Ian Christianson, on loan from New York Red Bulls.

Loan out 
  Kaká, loaned out for six months to São Paulo, his hometown club. Kaka will then start play with Orlando City on January 1, 2015 in preparation for the Club's inaugural MLS season.

Media 
For the 2014 season, all matches will stream live on YouTube. The team's webcasts in 2014 are produced with assistance from the ESPN Innovation Lab. Occasional matches will appear on Bright House Sports Network. Some home matches can be heard on the radio as well, either 740 the Game or 102.5/107.7-HD2 WLOQ.

See also 
 2014 in American soccer
 2014 USL Pro season
 Orlando City

References 

2014 USL Pro season
2014
American soccer clubs 2014 season
2014 in sports in Florida